The 1939 Texas A&M Aggies football team was an American football team that represented Texas A&M University in the Southwest Conference during the 1939 college football season. In their sixth year under head coach Homer Norton, the Aggies compiled a perfect 11-0 record, shut out six of eleven opponents, won the Southwest Conference championship, and outscored all opponents by a total of 212 to 31.

In the final AP Poll released on December 12, the Aggies were ranked No 1 with 1,091 points, edging out Tennessee (970 points), USC (891 points), and Cornell (889 points). They went on to defeat No. 5 Tulane, 14–13, in the 1940 Sugar Bowl.

Fullback John Kimbrough was a consensus pick on the 1939 All-America college football team. Kimbrough was inducted in 1954 into the College Football Hall of Fame.

Tackle Joe Boyd was the team captain. He was also chosen as a first-team All-American by, among others, Grantland Rice for Collier's Weekly and the Sporting News.

Four Texas A&M players were selected by the United Press as first-team players on the 1939 All-Southwest Conference football team: Kimbrough; Boyd; end Herbert Smith; and guard Marshall Robnett.

Schedule

Starting lineup

References

Texas AandM
Texas A&M Aggies football seasons
College football national champions
Southwest Conference football champion seasons
Sugar Bowl champion seasons
College football undefeated seasons
Texas AandM Aggies football